Piennes is a commune in the Meurthe-et-Moselle department in north-eastern France. The writer Anne-Marie Blanc winner of the 1978 Prix Erckmann-Chatrian was born in Piennes on 16 December 1931. Christiane Martel, Miss Universe 1953 was born in Piennes in 1938.

See also
Communes of the Meurthe-et-Moselle department

References

Communes of Meurthe-et-Moselle